In geometry, the hendecagonal prism is one in an infinite set of convex prisms formed by square sides and two regular polygon caps, in this case two hendecagons.
So, it has 2 hendecagons and 11 squares as its faces.

Related polyhedra

External links
 

Prismatoid polyhedra